Erik Nerell (born 29 January 1964) is a Norwegian former ice hockey player. He was born in Oslo, Norway and played for the club IL Manglerud Star. He played for the Norwegian national ice hockey team at the 1984 Winter Olympics.

References

External links

1964 births
Living people
Ice hockey players at the 1984 Winter Olympics
Norwegian ice hockey players
Olympic ice hockey players of Norway
Ice hockey people from Oslo